Pecalang (read "pechalang") are a type of local "traditional" security officers of an administrative village in Bali, Indonesia. Throughout Indonesia, they are uniquely present in Bali only and usually are engaged in mundane tasks such as assisting traffic control, but during large events (usually religious) are tasked with general security. They work in coordination with other state security and law enforcement agencies, which are the Satpol PP and the police. Pecalangs are local security bodies and report only to the village head, a Kepala Desa (akin to a Punong Barangay in Philippines). Pecalangs are not modern phenomena created for tourism; rather, Bali had hansip and pecalang security bodies for hundreds of years before the advent of modern tourism. These forces traditionally reported to one of the royal families of the historic Bali Kingdoms, also considered as their eyes and ears.

It has been reported that some 22,000 pecalang have been deployed for Nyepi celebrations in 2017.

Uniform
Pecalangs wear Balinese sarongs colored checkered white and black and usually wear black vests over their shirts. They also wear the traditional Balinese headdress known as "Udeng".

References

Law enforcement agencies of Indonesia
Bali